Istok (meaning "The Source") was the title of a Russian-language online magazine published by the Islamic State (ISIL/ISIS/IS) and released by Al-Hayat Media Center.

As of late 2016, Istok had apparently been supplanted by Rumiyah.

Issues 
The magazine issued four issues, starting from Rajab  to Rajab , before it was replaced by Rumiyah magazine.

See also
Dabiq (magazine)
Dar al-Islam (magazine)
Rumiyah (magazine)
Konstantiniyye (magazine)

References

Al-Hayat Media Center
Defunct political magazines
Irregularly published magazines
Islamic magazines
Islamic State of Iraq and the Levant and Russia
Magazines disestablished in 2016
Magazines established in 2015
News magazines published in Asia
Online magazines
Russian-language magazines